The following is a list of armed groups involved in the internal conflict in Myanmar, officially called "ethnic armed organisations" (EAOs) by the government of Myanmar.

Active

Defunct

Coalitions

See also 
 Combatants of the internal conflict in Myanmar
 List of political and military organisations in Myanmar

References

External links 
 Myanmar Peace Monitor – NGO based in Chaing Mai, Thailand that monitors Myanmar's ongoing peace process.
 Pyidaungsu Institute – Political institute based in Chaing Mai, Thailand focused on achieving political stability and peace in Myanmar.

Myanmar history-related lists
Internal conflict in Myanmar
Politics of Myanmar
Paramilitary organisations based in Myanmar

Lists of armed groups
Burmese military-related lists